The discography of Shellac, an American alternative rock band, includes five studio albums.
Shellac numbers almost all their releases.

Albums

Studio albums

Live album

Other album

Singles

 The Rude Gesture: A Pictorial History (1993, Touch and Go) - "The Guy Who Invented Fire", "Rambler Song", "Billiard Player Song"
 Uranus (1993, Touch and Go) - "Doris" b/w "Wingwalker"
 The Bird Is the Most Popular Finger (1994, Drag City) - "The Admiral" b/w "XVI" 
 "Billiardspielerlied" b/w "Mantel" (1995, Überschall Records)

Splits

Compilation
 The End of Radio (2019, Touch & Go) - two previously unreleased BBC John Peel sessions, recorded in 1994 and 2004

Compilation appearances
 "Copper Song" on the Ground Rule Double compilation 2×LP/CD (1995, Actionboy / Divot Records) 
 "Killers" on the Lounge Ax Defense & Relocation Compact Disk compilation CD (1996, Touch and Go Records)
 "Watch Song" on the Shellac Curated All Tomorrow's Parties 2.0 compilation CD (2002, ATPR)
 "Steady As She Goes (live)" on Burn To Shine Volume 2: Chicago IL 09.13.2004 compilation DVD (2005, Trixie DVD)
 "The End of Radio" on A.P. Bio Season 1 Episode 13 "Drenching Dallas" television series (2018, NBC)

References

Discographies of American artists
Rock music group discographies